"Dungaree Doll" is a song written by Sherman Edwards and Ben Raleigh and performed by Eddie Fisher featuring Hugo Winterhalter and His Orchestra and Chorus. It reached #7 in the U.S. in 1956.

The B-side to Fisher's version, "Everybody's Got a Home but Me", reached #20 in the U.S. in 1956.

Other versions
Mitch Miller and Orchestra released a version of the song as a single in 1955, but it did not chart.
Fred Bertelmann released a version of the song as a single in 1956 in Germany entitled "Tanderadei", but it did not chart.
Ray Ventura released a version of the song as a single in 1957 in France, but it did not chart.
Crazy Otto released a version of the song on his 1958 EP Crazy Otto International, Vol. 2. as part of medley with the songs "Manhattan" and "I Wonder Who's Kissing Her Now".
Jerry Lee Lewis released a version of the song on his 1999 album The Complete London Sessions, Vol. 1. This version was also featured in the 2006 remaster of The Session.

References

1955 songs
1955 singles
1956 singles
1957 singles
Songs written by Sherman Edwards
Eddie Fisher (singer) songs
Jerry Lee Lewis songs
RCA Records singles
Electrola singles
Songs with lyrics by Ben Raleigh